LCCA may refer to:

 Life Care Centers of America, an elder care company in the US
 Life cycle cost analysis, a tool to determine the most cost-effective option among different competing alternatives
 London Climate Change Agency in the United Kingdom
 Lutheran Church of Central Africa, a Christian denomination of the Lutheran tradition based in the African countries of Zambia and Malawi